In music,  (German for primary voice) or  is the main voice, chief part; i.e., the contrapuntal or melodic line of primary importance, in opposition to . The practice of marking the primary voice within the musical score/parts was invented by Arnold Schoenberg.

The terms are used primarily by Arnold Schoenberg, Alban Berg, and Anton Webern, but are not uncommon in scores for string quartet. They are commonly indicated in musical scores with the marks "H" and "N". When the "primary voice" ends in one instrument/staff/part, it may be marked with a closing bracket (such as  ¬ ) at the point where it passes to another instrument/staff/part.

Further contrapuntal lines or material may be considered accompaniment.

Other examples of the terms' use include lead and back up vocals, melody and counter-melody.

In a footnote to a musical score, Schoenberg wrote, "The human voice is always  [when present]."

Counter-melody

In music, a counter-melody (often countermelody) is a sequence of notes, perceived as a melody, written to be played simultaneously with a more prominent lead melody: a secondary melody played in counterpoint with the primary melody. A counter-melody performs a subordinate role, and is typically heard in a texture consisting of a melody plus accompaniment.

In marches, the counter melody is often given to the trombones  or horns (American composer David Wallis Reeves is credited with this innovation in 1876.)  The more formal term countersubject applies to a secondary or subordinate melodic idea in a fugue. A countermelody differs from a barbershop quartet-style harmony part sung by a backup singer in that whereas the harmony part typically lacks its own independent musical line, a countermelody is a distinct melodic line.

Hauptrhythmus

A  (plural ) is a rhythmic motif or cell.

The Hauptrhythmus of Alban Berg's Chamber Concerto is:

In Unicode
In Unicode, the Hauptstimme, Nebenstimme, and closing bracket symbols are part of the Musical Symbols and are coded as follows:

See also
Parallel harmony
Traditional sub-Saharan African harmony

Sources

Accompaniment
Counterpoint
German words and phrases
Melody
Musical terminology